Adrian "A. J." Majstrovich (born 9 February 1980) is a New Zealand-Australian former professional basketball player. He spent the majority of his 20-year career playing in the Australian NBL, New Zealand NBL and State Basketball League (SBL). He achieved the most success in New Zealand, winning two championships and earning the Rookie of the Year in 2003 and league MVP in 2004.

Early life and career
Majstrovich was born in Tūrangi, New Zealand, to Croatian parents, and was raised in Carnarvon, Western Australia, on his grandparents' banana plantation. He later moved to Perth, where he attended Morley Senior High School. In 1996, he made his SBL debut for the East Perth Eagles. In 1997, he moved to Canberra to attend the Australian Institute of Sport (AIS) and play for the program's SEABL team. He also represented Australia at Under 20 level from 1996 to 1999, making him ineligible for the Tall Blacks.

Professional career

Early ANBL years (1998–2001)
In 1998, Majstrovich joined the Perth Wildcats and made his Australian NBL debut. In 2000, he became an NBL champion, when the Wildcats defeated the Victoria Giants in the NBL Grand Final series. During the 1999 NBL off-season, he played for the East Perth Eagles. During the 2000–01 NBL season, he joined the Brisbane Bullets and played four games. Following the NBL season, he played for the Launceston Tigers in the SEABL.

First overseas stint (2001–2003)
Between 2001 and 2003, he played one season in Germany for TUS Jena and one season in Austria for UBC St.Pölten.

Return to ANBL and first stint in NZNBL (2003–2008)
In 2003, Majstrovich made his debut in the New Zealand NBL for the Hawke's Bay Hawks. He was named Rookie of the Year in his first season before going on to earn the MVP award in 2004. After returning to the Perth Wildcats for the 2004–05 season, Majstrovich returned to New Zealand in 2005 and played a third season for the Hawke's Bay Hawks, before joining the New Zealand Breakers for the 2005–06 NBL season. However, his debut season with the Breakers was cut short by a season-ending leg injury.

After a championship-winning season with the Hawks in 2006, Majstrovich joined the Adelaide 36ers for the 2006–07 NBL season. In 2007, he joined the Wellington Saints. In 2008, he joined the Auckland Stars.

Romania (2008)
Following his season with the Auckland Stars, Majstrovich moved to Romania to play for Tab Baldwin at CS Universitatea Mobitelco Cluj-Napoca. His stint ended in December 2008 after appearing in three league games and two EuroChallenge games.

SBL and NZNBL (2009–2016)

In 2009, Majstrovich returned to Perth and joined the Kalamunda Eastern Suns of the State Basketball League. He continued on with the Suns in 2010. In 2011 and 2012, he played for the Perth Redbacks, and in 2013, he played for the Perry Lakes Hawks.

For the 2014 season, Majstrovich initially joined the Nelson Giants in New Zealand, but a foot injury ruled him for the duration of the campaign. In June 2014, he moved to Kalgoorlie and joined the Goldfields Giants for the rest of the SBL season.

In 2015, Majstrovich returned to New Zealand and helped the Southland Sharks win the NBL championship.

In 2016, Majstrovich played one final season in the SBL, this time with the Stirling Senators.

Personal
Majstrovich is the son of Maja and Ozren, and has an older brother named Ivan. Majstrovich is married to wife Jaime.

In 2009, Majstrovich returned to Perth to study for a career as a civil draughtsman.

References

External links

ANBL profile
Basketball New Zealand profile
ANBL stats
SBL stats

1980 births
Living people
Adelaide 36ers players
Auckland Stars players
Brisbane Bullets players
CS Universitatea Cluj-Napoca (men's basketball) players
Forwards (basketball)
Hawke's Bay Hawks players
New Zealand Breakers players
New Zealand expatriate basketball people in Romania
New Zealand men's basketball players
New Zealand people of Croatian descent
People from Tūrangi
Perth Wildcats players
Southland Sharks players
Wellington Saints players
Sportspeople from Waikato